The governor of Zamboanga Sibugay is the local chief executive of the Philippine province of Zamboanga Sibugay. The governor holds office at the Zamboanga Sibugay Provincial Capitol. Like all local government heads in the Philippines, the governor is elected via popular vote, and may not be elected for a fourth consecutive term (although the former governor may return to office after an interval of one term). In case of death, resignation or incapacity, the vice governor becomes the governor.

History

Prior to the creation of this office, Zamboanga Sibugay used to be the 3rd Legislative District of Zamboanga del Sur. On February 22, 2001, a plebiscite was held for the said area, and a new province was created. George Hofer, the author of Republic Act No. 8973 and Zamboanga del Sur's 3rd District Representative at the time, served as the province's first governor.

List

Elections

2022

2019

2016

2013

2010

References

Governors of Zamboanga Sibugay
Politics of Zamboanga Sibugay
Governors of provinces of the Philippines